Qeshlaq-e Mohammad Beyg, also rendered as Qeshlaq-e Mohammad Beyk, may refer to:
Qeshlaq-e Mohammad Beyg-e Olya, Ardabil Province, Iran
Qeshlaq-e Mohammad Beyg-e Sofla, Ardabil Province, Iran